Stéphane Tempier (born 5 March 1986) is a French cross-country mountain biker who races for the Trek Factory Racing. He won the silver medal in the junior cross country at the 2004 world championships in Les Gets, France. At the 2005 world championships he won the bronze medal in the cross country team relay, riding the men's under-23 leg for the French team.

Tempier represented France in the mountain bike cross country at the 2012 Summer Olympics and finished in 11th place, 2:23 behind the winner. He was on the start list for the 2018 Cross-country European Championship and he finished 6th. The following year he won the bronze medal at the 2019 World Championships in Mont-Sainte Anne, Canada.

Palmares

Olympic Games
 Mountain bike, men
 11th in 2012

World Championships
 Junior cross-country
  2nd in 2004

 Under-23 cross-country
 30th in 2005
 4th in 2006
 27th in 2007
 5th in 2008

 Elite men cross-country
 12th in 2009
 15th in 2010
 30th in 2011
 9th in 2012
 9th in 2013
 40th in 2014
 15th in 2015
 5th in 2016
15th in 2017
11th in 2018
3rd in 2019
DNF in 2020

 Cross-country team relay
 4th in 2004
  3rd in 2005
 4th in 2006

World Cup
 Elite men cross-country
 16th in 2009
 15th in 2010
 9th in 2011
 15th in 2012
 12th in 2013
 5th in 2014
 6th in 2016
38th in 2015
2nd in 2017
10th in 2018
6th in 2019
57th in 2020

References

External links
 Stéphane Tempier's official website

French male cyclists
Cross-country mountain bikers
Living people
Olympic cyclists of France
Cyclists at the 2012 Summer Olympics
1986 births
People from Gap, Hautes-Alpes
Sportspeople from Hautes-Alpes
Cyclists from Provence-Alpes-Côte d'Azur